Abdul-Rahman bin Nasir al-Barrak (born 1933 or 1934) is a Saudi Salafi cleric.

In 1994, al-Barrak and other Saudi clerics were mentioned by name and praised by Osama bin Laden for opposing then-Grand Mufti Abd al-Aziz ibn Baz in his Open Letter to Shaykh Bin Baz on the Invalidity of his Fatwa on Peace with the Jews.

His website was banned in Saudi Arabia because it was “promoting bold ideas and theses”.

Fatwas

Al-Barrak has drawn attention for issuing controversial fatwas, or religious edicts. One such fatwa called for strict gender segregation.  The fatwa states, "Whoever allows this mixing ... allows forbidden things, and whoever allows them is a kafir and this means defection from Islam ... Either he retracts or he must be killed ... because he disavows and does not observe the Sharia."

In March 2008, al-Barrak issued a fatwa that two writers for the newspaper Al Riyadh, Abdullah bin Bejad al-Otaibi and Yousef Aba al-Khail, should be tried for apostasy for their "heretical articles" regarding the categorization of "unbelievers" and put to death if they did not repent.

References

1930s births
Living people
Saudi Arabian Sunni clerics
Fatwas
Sex segregation and Islam
Critics of Shia Islam
Saudi Arabian Salafis
People from Al Bukayriah
Academic staff of Imam Muhammad ibn Saud Islamic University
Saudi Arabian imams
Saudi Arabian Sunni Muslim scholars of Islam
Year of birth missing (living people)